Angelos Pavlakakis (born 7 November 1976 in Xanthi) is a retired Greek sprinter who specialized in the 100 metres.

He won the bronze medal at the 1995 European Junior Championships, the gold medals at the 1997 Mediterranean Games and the 1998 European Indoor Championships and the bronze medal at the 2000 European Indoor Championships. He also competed at the 2000 Olympic Games, the 1997 World Championships and the World Indoor Championships in 1997, 2001 and 2004 without reaching the final.

His personal best time was 10.11 seconds, achieved at the 1997 World Championships in Athens. This is the Greek record.

International competitions

References

External links
 

1976 births
Living people
Greek male sprinters
Athletes (track and field) at the 2000 Summer Olympics
Olympic athletes of Greece
World Athletics Championships athletes for Greece
Sportspeople from Xanthi
Mediterranean Games gold medalists for Greece
Mediterranean Games medalists in athletics
Athletes (track and field) at the 1997 Mediterranean Games
20th-century Greek people